DD India is an international state-owned English language news and current affairs channel from India. The service is also aimed at the overseas market, similar to WION, CNN International, BBC World News, DW, TV5Monde, VOA, NHK World, Arirang, KBS World, CNA, RT, RTR-Planeta and broadcast through satellite and cable operators throughout the world as well as online and through its mobile apps. It became a full-fledged English news and current affairs channel in January 2019 followed by a decision of the parent Prasar Bharati's board.

DD India, a public service broadcaster, has been the second most watched English news channel in India since 2017 after Republic TV. It became the most watched channel in February 2019, according to the Indian newspaper Live Mint. In the first quarter of 2019, DD India and Republic TV have alternated for the most-watched channel position in the English channel news weekly ratings as measured by BARC India group. Prasar Bharati enhanced the DD India channel to DD India HD. DD India HD channel launched on 3 October 2020. Now DD India HD channel also available on DD Free dish DTH.

History
DD India, an Indian pay television channel that was launched on 14 March 1995 as DD International, is available in 146 countries throughout the world. It was rebranded as DD World in  2000 and again in 2002 as DD India. It is owned and operated by Doordarshan, India's state-owned television network. The international broadcaster features some original programming, such as dramas, comedy series, talk shows, documentaries, and re-runs of popular TV shows from other Indian television channels. In addition, it also airs some TV shows in other Indian languages, such as Urdu, Punjabi, Tamil, Telugu etc.

In the United States, the channel was launched on 26 July 2007, and is available on DirecTV.

On January 1, 2019, it was relaunched as an English-language news channel, as Doordashan turned its already-dedicated news channel, DD News, into a Hindi-language only network while the international version of DD National was launched.

See also
List of Indian television stations
Doordarshan Network

References

External links 
 

Doordarshan
English-language television stations in India
24-hour television news channels in India
Television stations in New Delhi
Foreign television channels broadcasting in the United Kingdom
Television channels and stations established in 2003
Direct broadcast satellite services
State media    
Indian direct broadcast satellite services
Mass media of Indian diaspora
Television channels and stations established in 1995